Sara Gadimova (31 May 1922 – 12 May 2005) Sara Gadimova, who started her career as a soloist of the Azerbaijan State Philharmonic Society in 1941, was recognized as a singer in a short time thanks to her unique talent and gained great love for the audience. The song "Compassionate sister", which was created by Uzeyir Hajibeyov and Samad Vurgun in the Second World War, was read by the singer before the Azerbaijani soldiers on the frontline. Hero became an embodiment of the Azerbaijani woman. Noted particularly for her dastgah performance, which excelled other female dastgah performances, she also sang Bayaty-Shiraz, Karabakh shikastasi and other mugham varieties. Gadimova toured twenty two foreign countries. She was awarded the Sharaf Order and Shohrat Order.

Life
Gadimova was born in Baku. Her father Babish hailed from the village of Gülablı, but settled in Baku. Having graduated from medical school, Gadimova entered the Baku Music Academy and completed studies there in 1941. Among her music mentors were Huseyngulu Sarabski, Khan Shushinski and Seyid Shushinski. During World War II and the First Nagorno-Karabakh War, Gadimova performed patriotic songs for soldiers. At the age of 22 Gadimova married Gadir Islamzadeh, who was older by 24 years. They eventually separated after eight years. In the 1950s Gadimova was already a popular singer. In 1954 she was awarded the title of the People's Artist of Azerbaijan.

Gadimova died after prolonged illness at the age of 82, having dreamed of performing Karabakh shikastasi in the Armenian-occupied Agdam District of Azerbaijan. Her voice is lyric-coloratric soprano. Along with ADF's soloist (from 1941), she was also a master of the ADOBT in 1957-1962. Sara Gadimova had a great influence in the education of artists such as Hüseyinqulu Sarabski, Khan Shushinski and Seyid Shushinski. As a worthy successor to his predecessors, she remained loyal to the tradition of classical singing until the end of his life. In the Azerbaijan State Opera and Ballet Theater, Sara Gadimova's name, performed at leading parties, was remembered by Leyli and Asli's paintings created on the opera scene. "Bayati-Shiraz", "Shur", "Shahnaz", "Qatar", "Mahur-hindi", "Foreign Seagah" mugams and various Azerbaijani folk songs performed by him in his history are written in golden letters. Performed by singer, "Garabagh Shikestesi" plays a special place in the history of Azerbaijani music. Sara Gadimova, who deeply fascinates folk music, is one of the great artists who enrich our national musical treasure, playing a decent place in the Azerbaijani khanate school with deep historical roots, traditions and contributed to its development. The ability to penetrate the inner world of the listener, and the ability to create a strong emotional effect, was characteristic of Sara Gadimova's creativity. The main source of his singing, which has been around for more than sixty years, is to serve the culture of Azerbaijan. Sara Gadimova's lifestyle characteristic of our national music will always be an example for the young Khanand generation.

Sara Gadimova, who has repeatedly represented our national culture in foreign countries, has drawn Azerbaijani folk music to representatives of different nationalities and was deeply sympathetic to the most prestigious scenes.

Commemoration
On 30 May 2007 a commemorative plaque dedicated to Gadimova was unveiled on 27 Uzeyir Hajibayov Street in Baku, where she lived.

References

Mugham singers
People's Artists of Azerbaijan
Soviet Azerbaijani people
1922 births
2005 deaths
Musicians from Baku
20th-century Azerbaijani women singers